Scirpophaga subumbrosa is a moth in the family Crambidae. It was described by Edward Meyrick in 1933. It is found in the Democratic Republic of the Congo (West Kasai, Katanga), Ethiopia, Ghana, Madagascar, Malawi, Mozambique, Nigeria, Senegal, Sierra Leone, Sudan, Tanzania and Zambia.

The wingspan is 22–28 mm for males and 28–40 mm for females. The forewings of the males vary from pale ochreous white to pale ochreous. The hindwings are pale ochreous white. The forewings and hindwings of the females are white with a pale ochreous-yellow anal tuft.

The larvae feed on Oryza sativa.

References

Moths described in 1933
Schoenobiinae
Moths of Africa